Aldjon Pashaj (born 17 July 1994 in Fier, Albania) is an Albanian-Greek footballer who last played  for Gamma Ethniki club Kallithea  as a goalkeeper.

Club career
In summer 2013, Pashaj signed his first professional contrast with Glyfada F.C. and one year later he signed for Apollon Smyrni. On 25 January 2017 Apollon Smyrnis F.C. announced the termination of his contract with team claiming a both ways will.

External links
 
 Apollon Smirnis Profile
 footballleaguenews.gr Profile

1994 births
Living people
Sportspeople from Fier
Association football goalkeepers
Albanian footballers
A.O. Glyfada players
Apollon Smyrnis F.C. players
Kallithea F.C. players
Albanian expatriate footballers
Expatriate footballers in Greece
Albanian expatriate sportspeople in Greece